Elbersdorf is a village in the municipality Dürrröhrsdorf-Dittersbach, in the landkreis Sächsische Schweiz-Osterzgebirge, in Saxony, Germany. The village is near the river Wesenitz and is known for the Belvedere Schöne Höhe: a castle on the top of the hill of the village. Formerly an independent municipality, it was absorbed into Porschendorf in 1969, and with Porschendorf into Dürrröhrsdorf-Dittersbach in 1994.

References

Former municipalities in Saxony
Populated places in Sächsische Schweiz-Osterzgebirge